Valle Giulia is a valley area of Rome, immortalised in Fontane di Roma.

See also
Villa Giulia
Battle of Valle Giulia

Geography of Rome
Rome Q. III Pinciano